Campodorus is a genus of parasitic wasps in the tribe Mesoleiini.

Species 

 Campodorus abietinus
 Campodorus aemulus
 Campodorus aequabilis
 Campodorus agarcin
 Campodorus agilis
 Campodorus aglaia
 Campodorus alaskensis
 Campodorus almaatensis
 Campodorus alticola
 Campodorus amictus
 Campodorus aquilonaris
 Campodorus arctor
 Campodorus assiduus
 Campodorus astutus
 Campodorus atripes
 Campodorus atrofemorator
 Campodorus autumnalis
 Campodorus axillaris
 Campodorus barbator
 Campodorus belokobylskii
 Campodorus boreator
 Campodorus bovei
 Campodorus caligatus
 Campodorus callidulus
 Campodorus celator
 Campodorus ciliator
 Campodorus ciliatus
 Campodorus circumspectus
 Campodorus clypealis
 Campodorus clypeatus
 Campodorus commotus
 Campodorus contiguus
 Campodorus convexus
 Campodorus corrugatus
 Campodorus crassipes
 Campodorus crassitarsis
 Campodorus crassitarsus
 Campodorus curtitarsis
 Campodorus dauricus
 Campodorus deletus
 Campodorus difformis
 Campodorus dorsalis
 Campodorus efferus
 Campodorus elegans
 Campodorus elini
 Campodorus epachthoides
 Campodorus euurae
 Campodorus exiguus
 Campodorus facialis
 Campodorus fennicus
 Campodorus flavescens
 Campodorus flavicinctus
 Campodorus flavipes
 Campodorus flavomaculatus
 Campodorus formosus
 Campodorus fraudator
 Campodorus fuscipes
 Campodorus gallicator
 Campodorus gallicus
 Campodorus genator
 Campodorus gilvilabris
 Campodorus glyptus
 Campodorus gracilipes
 Campodorus haematodes
 Campodorus hamulus
 Campodorus holmgreni
 Campodorus humerellus
 Campodorus hyperboreus
 Campodorus ignavus
 Campodorus immarginatus
 Campodorus incidens
 Campodorus infidus
 Campodorus insularis
 Campodorus intermedius
 Campodorus kukakensis
 Campodorus kunashiricus
 Campodorus labytnangi
 Campodorus laevipectus
 Campodorus languidulus
 Campodorus latiscapus
 Campodorus liosternus
 Campodorus lituratus
 Campodorus lobatus
 Campodorus longicaudatus
 Campodorus longicornutus
 Campodorus lucidator
 Campodorus luctuosus
 Campodorus maculicollis
 Campodorus marginalis
 Campodorus marginator
 Campodorus mediosanguineus
 Campodorus melanogaster
 Campodorus melanopygus
 Campodorus meridionalis
 Campodorus micropunctatus
 Campodorus minutator
 Campodorus mixtus
 Campodorus modestus
 Campodorus molestus
 Campodorus mollis
 Campodorus monticola
 Campodorus mordax
 Campodorus nematicida
 Campodorus nigridens
 Campodorus nigriventris
 Campodorus nikandrovskii
 Campodorus nubilis
 Campodorus obscurator
 Campodorus obtusus
 Campodorus orientalis
 Campodorus patagiatus
 Campodorus pectinator
 Campodorus pequenitor
 Campodorus perspicuus
 Campodorus pervicax
 Campodorus picens
 Campodorus pictipes
 Campodorus pineti
 Campodorus polaris
 Campodorus riphaeus
 Campodorus rubens
 Campodorus rubidus
 Campodorus sakhalinator
 Campodorus sanguinator
 Campodorus savinskii
 Campodorus scapularis
 Campodorus semipunctus
 Campodorus sexcarinatus
 Campodorus signator
 Campodorus spurius
 Campodorus stenocerus
 Campodorus subarctor
 Campodorus subfasciatus
 Campodorus suomi
 Campodorus suspicax
 Campodorus taigator
 Campodorus tenebrosus
 Campodorus tenuitarsis
 Campodorus thalia
 Campodorus torvus
 Campodorus transbaikalicus
 Campodorus tristis
 Campodorus ucrainicus
 Campodorus ultimus
 Campodorus ussuriensis
 Campodorus variegatus
 Campodorus versutus
 Campodorus vestergreni
 Campodorus vicinus
 Campodorus viduus
 Campodorus yakutator

References

External links 
 
 

Ichneumonidae genera
Ctenopelmatinae
Taxa named by Arnold Förster